Risotto is the fourth album by British electronica group Fluke. The album was released on 26 May 1997 by Circa Records and 30 September 1997 by Astralwerks. It was the band's last album recorded with Mike Tournier.

Overview
The album is named after the dish risotto. The album artwork was designed by The Designers Republic and features a chrome-plated KitchenAid mixer.

Many of the tracks that brought Fluke to a larger audience are featured on this album, including "Atom Bomb", used on the Wipeout 2097 soundtrack, and "Absurd," used in many films/trailers, including a 1998 Volkswagen Beetle commercial, Sin City in 2005, and the episode "Chaos" from the show Spaced. "Absurd" is also used as the main theme for Sky Sports''' Monday Night Football program first from August 1997 to May 1998 and since August 2010 to the current day.- 

When Fluke was touring for Risotto they were joined on stage by Rachel Stewart who acted as a personification of the band's official mascot, a character from the Wipeout series named Arial Tetsuo. Stewart continued as lead female vocalist and as a dancer for all of Fluke's live performances between 1997 and 1999.

After touring for a year with Risotto on the American "Electric Highway Tour", and having made two appearances at the Glastonbury festival in 1995 and 1998, Tournier decided to leave the group to pursue a different project named Syntax, with the band's long standing friend, Jan Burton. In 2002, The Fluke DJs were formed, a live-show pairing of Jon Fugler and Hugh Bryder. Bryder was a DJ who had assisted Fluke in their live performances since 1993 as well as working with other DJs such as Seb Fontaine while holding a DJ residency at MTV's special event parties. This seemed to indicate further rifts within the band as this DJ combination included neither Mike Bryant nor Tournier. However, Fugler denied these rumours shortly after they surfaced claiming that the band merely needed some time away from each other after their intense work on Risotto.

Critical receptionRisotto was perhaps the most favourably reviewed of all Fluke's albums with David Bennun of The Guardian writing:

Writing for Melody Maker in October 1997, Neil Kulkarni gave Risotto a very positive review, singling out the album's lyrics as a highlight; "[Fluke] have the dumbest greatest deepest lyrics in dance – "Baby's got an atom-bomb/a motherfuckin' atom bomb" is the greatest heavy metal lyric never written; "Anybody with a heart votes love" is a chorus Stevie Wonder would be proud of; "Think big that's only half as large/Bigger, better, twice as hard"'' is Ooompah-Loompah haiku made pop poetry."

Track listing
"Absurd" – 5:48
"Atom Bomb" – 5:45
"Kitten Moon" – 9:18
"Mosh" – 6:20
"Bermuda" – 7:57
"Setback" – 8:54
"Amp" – 8:09
"Reeferendrum" – 7:22
"Squirt" – 6:15
"Goodnight Lover" – 7:34

References

Fluke (band) albums
1997 albums
Astralwerks albums
Albums with cover art by The Designers Republic